DecoTurf is a brand of tennis hardcourt constructed from layers of acrylic resin, rubber, silica, and other materials on top of an asphalt or concrete base. It is manufactured by the sports surfaces division of California Products Corporation, based in Andover, Massachusetts.

The surface is currently in use at the following tournaments:

Cincinnati Masters
Dubai Championships
Canada Masters
China Open
Japan Open
Shanghai Masters

DecoTurf was used at the US Open from 1978 to 2019, at the 2020 Olympics held in Tokyo, Japan; the 2008 Olympics held in Beijing, China and the 2004 Olympics held in Athens, Greece, as well as the Paralympic Games at both sites.

See also
Plexicushion
Rebound Ace
GreenSet
Laykold

References

External links 

Tennis court surfaces